Warwick Buckland (1863–1945) was a British stage actor. He later became a film actor and director. He directed the 1915 crime film After Dark. Buckland also worked as an art director, designing the sets for the epic Barnaby Rudge made by Hepworth Pictures.

Selected filmography

Director
 After Dark (1915)

Actor
 The Vicar of Wakefield (1913)
 The Old Curiosity Shop (1913)
 The Heart of Midlothian (1914)
 Trelawny of the Wells (1916)
 The Grip of Iron (1920)

References

Bibliography
 Goble, Alan. The Complete Index to Literary Sources in Film. Walter de Gruyter, 1999.

External links

1863 births
1945 deaths
British film directors
British male film actors
British male stage actors